700 MHz  may refer to:

Telecommunications (spectrum management)
APT band plan in the 700 MHz band, a type of segmentation of the 700 MHz band created by the Asia-Pacific Telecommunity
US band plan in the 700 MHz band, a type of segmentation of the 700 MHz band created by the Federal Communications Commission